This is a list of law enforcement agencies in England and Wales.

National law enforcement
Police

Bodies with police powers
National Crime Agency

Bodies with limited executive powers

Bodies with solely investigatory powers

Bodies hosted by the Association of Chief Police Officers

Bodies hosted by territorial police forces

Subnational law enforcement
Regional motorway policing units

Regional counter terrorism units

Regional organised crime units

Territorial police forces

Ports police

Parks police

Other

See also
List of law enforcement agencies in the United Kingdom, Crown Dependencies and British Overseas Territories
List of law enforcement agencies in Northern Ireland
List of law enforcement agencies in Scotland

References
List of UK police forces – Police.uk

 
Law enforcement
Lists of law enforcement agencies